
This is a list of aircraft in alphabetical order beginning with 'Tu'.

Tu

TU-Braunschweig, Institut für Luftfahrtmeßtechnik und Flugmeteorologie 
see: Braunschweig

Tuareg
(Tuareg Aerobatics)
 Tuareg CEA309 Mehari

 Tucker 
(Tucker Aviation Co, Detroit, MI)
 Tucker P-57

 Tucker 
(Tucker Aviation Co, Detroit, MI)
 Tucker XP-57

 Tucker 
(L G Tucker, Pittsburgh, PA, c.1980: Greeneville, TN)
 Tucker Le Petit Cygne
 Tucker Pamela

Tumonecotrans
(Tumonecotrans / Alexander Filimonov)
 Tumonecotrans Bella 1

 Tunison 
((M C) Tunison Aircraft, Santa Ana, CA)
 Tunison Scout Junior

 Tupolev 
 ANT-1
 ANT-2
 ANT-3
 ANT-4
 ANT-5
 ANT-6
 ANT-7
 ANT-8
 ANT-9
 ANT-10
 ANT-11
 ANT-12
 ANT-13
 ANT-14
 ANT-15
 ANT-16
 ANT-17
 ANT-18
 ANT-20
 ANT-20bis
 ANT-21
 ANT-22
 ANT-23
 ANT-24
 ANT-25
 ANT-26
 ANT-27
 ANT-27bis
 ANT-28
 ANT-29
 ANT-30
 ANT-31
 ANT-31bis
 ANT-32
 ANT-33
 ANT-34
 ANT-35
 ANT-35bis
 ANT-36
 ANT-37
 ANT-37bis
 ANT-38
 ANT-39
 ANT-40
 ANT-41
 ANT-42
 ANT-43
 ANT-44
 ANT-45
 ANT-46
 ANT-47
 ANT-48
 ANT-49
 ANT-50
 ANT-51
 ANT-53
 ANT-56
 ANT-57
 ANT-58
 ANT-59
 ANT-60
 ANT-61
 ANT-62
 ANT-63
 ANT-63P
 ANT-64
 ANT-65
 ANT-66
 ANT-67
 ANT-68
 Tupolev 69
 Tupolev 71
 Tupolev 72
 Tupolev 73
 Tupolev 77
 Tupolev 78
 Tupolev 79
 Tupolev 81
 Tupolev 83
 Tupolev 84
 Tupolev 87
 Tupolev 88
 Tupolev 89
 Tupolev 90
 Tupolev 92
 Tupolev 93
 Tupolev 94
 Tupolev 97
 Tupolev 99
 Tupolev 100
 Tupolev 101
 Tupolev 102
 Tupolev 103
 Tupolev 105
 Tupolev 127
 Tupolev 134
 Tupolev 135
 Tupolev 138
 Tupolev 139
 Tupolev 143
 Tupolev 145
 Tupolev 156
 Tupolev 164
 Tupolev DB-2
 Tupolev DI-8
 Tupolev DIP
 Tupolev DPB
 Tupolev FB
 Tupolev G-1
 Tupolev G-2
 Tupolev I-4 ANT-5
 Tupolev I-8 ANT-13
 Tupolev I-12 ANT-23
 Tupolev I-14
 Tupolev MTB-2
 Tupolev MDR-2
 Tupolev MDR-4
 Tupolev MG
 Tupolev MI-3
 Tupolev MK-1
 Tupolev MTB-1
 Tupolev MP-6
 Tupolev PS-3
 Tupolev PS-7
 Tupolev PS-9
 Tupolev PS-35
 Tupolev PS-40
 Tupolev PS-41
 Tupolev PS-124
 Tupolev R-3
 Tupolev R-6 ANT-7
 Tupolev R-7
 Tupolev RD
 Tupolev RDD
 Tupolev RShR
 Tupolev Samolyet Yu
 Tupolev 28-80
 Tupolev SB ANT-40
 Tupolev T-1
 Tupolev TB-1 ANT-4
 Tupolev TB-3 ANT-6
 Tupolev TB-4
 Tupolev TB-6
 Tupolev TShB
 Tupolev USB
 Tupolev UTB
 Tupolev Tu-1
 Tupolev Tu-2 ANT-58
 Tupolev Tu-4
 Tupolev Tu-6
 Tupolev Tu-8
 Tupolev Tu-12
 Tupolev Tu-14
 Tupolev Tu-16 "88"
 Tupolev Tu-22 "105"
 Tupolev Tu-22M "145"
 Tupolev Tu-70
 Tupolev Tu-75
 Tupolev Tu-76
 Tupolev Tu-79
 Tupolev Tu-80
 Tupolev Tu-81
 Tupolev Tu-82
 Tupolev Tu-85
 Tupolev Tu-86
 Tupolev Tu-91
 Tupolev Tu-95
 Tupolev Tu-96
 Tupolev Tu-104
 Tupolev Tu-105
 Tupolev Tu-107
 Tupolev Tu-110
 Tupolev Tu-111
 Tupolev Tu-114
 Tupolev Tu-115
 Tupolev Tu-116
 Tupolev Tu-117
 Tupolev Tu-118
 Tupolev Tu-119
 Tupolev Tu-121
 Tupolev Tu-123 Yastreb cruise missile
 Tupolev Tu-124
 Tupolev Tu-125 project
 Tupolev Tu-126
 Tupolev Tu-127
 Tupolev Tu-128
 Tupolev Tu-130
 Tupolev Tu-134
 Tupolev Tu-142
 Tupolev Tu-143
 Tupolev Tu-144
 Tupolev Tu-148
 Tupolev Tu-154
 Tupolev Tu-155
 Tupolev Tu-156
 Tupolev Tu-160
 Tupolev Tu-161
 Tupolev Tu-174
 Tupolev Tu-184
 Tupolev Tu-194
 Tupolev Tu-204
 Tupolev Tu-206
 Tupolev Tu-214
 Tupolev Tu-216
 Tupolev Tu-224
 Tupolev Tu-234
 Tupolev Tu-244
 Tupolev Tu-300
 Tupolev Tu-304
 Tupolev Tu-306
 Tupolev Tu-330
 Tupolev Tu-334
 Tupolev Tu-336
 Tupolev Tu-338
 Tupolev Tu-344
 Tupolev Tu-354
 Tupolev Tu-360
 Tupolev Tu-404
 Tupolev Tu-414
 Tupolev Tu-444
 Tupolev Tu-2000

 Turbay 
(Sfreddo & Paolini S.A., Turbay S.A. / Alfredo Turbay)
 Turbay T-1 Tucán
 Turbay T-2
 Turbay T-3

Turkish Air Force
(TuAF 2nd Air Maintenance Centre Türk Hava Kuvvetleri'')
 TuAF AK-1 Fethi

Turner 
(Bill Turner)
 Turner Gee Bee Model Z Super Sportster

Turner
(Chris Turner)
 Turner Two Seat Wot

Turner 
((Lawrence) Brown Aircraft Co, Montebello, CA)
 Turner Special a.k.a. Pesco Special

Turner 
( M L Turner, Oklahoma City, OK, 1961: (Eugene L) Turner Aircraft, Fort Worth, TX)
 Turner 40A
 Turner T-40
 Turner Super T-40A
 Turner T-40B
 Turner T-40C
 Turner T-77 Ophelia Bumps
 Turner T-80 Texas Tern

Tuscar 
(Management & Research Inc, New York, NY)
 Tuscar H-70
 Tuscar H-71

Tuxhorn 
( Blaine M) Tuxhorn Flying School, Mid-Continent Air Transport (origin of Ozark Airlines), Kansas City, KS)
 Tuxhorn Air Liner
 Tuxhorn Lark

References

Further reading

External links 

 List of aircraft (T)